Jeffrey D. Fisher is an American author and professor emeritus of real estate at the Indiana University Kelley School of Business where he was the founding director of the Center for Real Estate Studies and Charles Dunn Professor of Finance and Real Estate. He is also a visiting professor at Johns Hopkins University and a member of the advisory committee at Sterling Valuation Group. He is the president of the Homer Hoyt Institute and is a research and education consultant to the National Council of Real Estate Investment Fiduciaries (NCREIF). He is also a founding Partner in the Pavonis Group and a board member of RealNex.

Education and career 
Fisher has a doctorate in real estate from Ohio State University, an MBA from Wright State University and an undergraduate degree in Management from Purdue University. Fisher has held positions on the boards of directors for the National Council of Real Estate Investment Fiduciaries (NCREIF), the Real Estate Research Institute (RERI), and the Pension Real Estate Association (PREA). He won the Richard Ratcliff, Pioneer and Legacy Awards from the American Real Estate Society, the George Bloom Award from the American Real Estate and Urban Economics Association, the Martin S. Katz Memorial Award from the American Property Tax Council (APTC), the PREA/Graaskamp Award for Research Excellence from the Pension Real Estate Association, as well as the Dietz Award for the best article in the Journal of Performance Measurement.

Fisher has testified as an expert witness in court proceedings for different organizations, including Inland Steel, Simon Property Group, and the Internal Revenue Service. He has provided advice to the multifamily division of the Federal National Mortgage Association (Fannie Mae) and the Federal Reserve System in Washington, DC. He has spoken on real estate investing on CNBC, and the Wall Street Journal, among other publications. Fisher served as one of founding trustees for The Appraisal Foundation, a self-regulatory body, and a source of standards for the appraisal business, was founded in 1987 by the major appraisal organizations. He served as the American Real Estate and Urban Economics Association's (AREUEA) President in 1990 and the Real Estate Center Directors and Chairholders' Association chairman in 1986–1987. To create and instruct courses and seminars, he has collaborated with different professional organizations, including NCREIF, PREA, the Appraisal Institute, the CCIM Institute, NACORE, and others.

Publications 
He is a coauthor of three books: Real Estate, 9th edition by John Wiley and Sons, Real Estate Finance and Investments, 17th edition by McGraw-Hill (translated into Japanese, Chinese and Korean) and Income Property Valuation by Dearborn.  He also contributed chapters to many other books and readings including “Private Real estate Investments” used in the Chartered Financial Analyst (CFA) curriculum.

Honors and awards 

 Dietz Award from the Journal of Performance Measurement, 2022 for the best article in the journal during 2022.
 Ricardo Award from American Real Estate Society, 2016 for outstanding contributions to real estate research and education.
 Pioneer Award from American Real Estate Society, 2012 for pioneering contributions to research and education during my career.
 Legacy Award from American Real Estate Society, 2012 for best paper in the Journal of Real Estate Research during past three years.
 Richard Ratcliff award from the American Real Estate Society for impact on the real estate profession, April 2007.
 Excellent Writing Prize awarded by the Real Estate Companies Association of Japan, 2007 for Japanese version of Income Property Valuation textbook.
 Honorary Fellow in the Japanese Association for Real Estate Securitization, Tokyo, 2006.
 Martin Katz award for contributions to the valuation literature – awarded by the American Property Tax Association (APTC) 2004. 
 Most Outstanding Paper in 2001 in the Journal of Property Investment and Finance. 
 Counselor of Real Estate (CRE) designation awarded by The Counselors of Real Estate, 2001
 Schuyler F. Otteson teaching award, IU Kelley School of Business, 2001.
 Indiana University Teaching Excellence Recognition Award, 2,000
 George Bloom Award for “Outstanding Contribution to the Field of Real Estate”, 1999.
 1993 Alpha Kappa Psi Alumni Award for Teaching Excellence in Finance in the Indiana University School of Business.
 PREA/Graaskamp Award for Research Excellence, presented at the Annual Plan Sponsor Real Estate Conference by the Pension Real Estate Association.  1992.
 Post Doctoral Award from the Homer Hoyt Institute, 1983.

References 

Living people
Year of birth missing (living people)